Jolien is a Belgian female given name that may refer to
Jolien Boumkwo (born 1993), Belgian field athlete 
Jolien D'Hoore (born 1990), Belgian cyclist 
Jolien Sysmans (born 1992), Belgian swimmer
Jolien Verschueren (1990–2021), Belgian cyclo-cross cyclist
Jolien Wittock (born 1990), Belgian volleyball player